Nina Williams (born August 21, 1990) is an American professional rock climber based in Boulder, Colorado, best known for her highball bouldering.

Early life 
Williams was born in Killingly, Connecticut and grew up in Pawtucket, Rhode Island. She started climbing in New Hampshire in 2002, after trying ballet, soccer and horseback riding.

In 2017, Williams wrote a personal essay for Rock & Ice magazine about being exposed as a cheater as a young teenager, after falsifying her results in a USA Climbing regional qualifier competition. As a result of her actions, she was banned from competition for the season. In a 2016 interview with Chris Weidner, Williams said that the intense pressure she put on herself to win and a lack of confidence led her to cheat. Returning to competition climbing required Williams to reshape her mental approach, writing that rather than seeking external approval, she would "climb because I love it".

Climbing career

Bouldering 
In 2015, she completed her first  in Rocklands, South Africa by completing the first female ascent of Ray of Light.

Williams is noted for her highball bouldering, in which the climber attempts a very tall boulder problem without rope protection, combining the physicality of bouldering with the mental discipline of free soloing. In 2017, Williams completed the first female ascent of Ambrosia in the Buttermilks, and Climbing magazine called it, "one of the hardest free solos ever done by a woman". Williams has also completed two other difficult routes on the same boulder, Evilution Direct (V11) and Footprints (V9) to complete the "Grandpa Peabody Trifecta", the first woman ever to do so.

In February 2018, she made the fourth ascent, and first female ascent, of Window Shopper , in Boulder, Colorado.  In March 2019, she made the seventh ascent, and first female ascent, of Too Big to Flail  a 50 ft highball in the Buttermilks.

Williams was featured in the short film, The High Road (2019), which was selected for the Banff Mountain Film Festival, and shown during the REELROCK 14 film tour. The film focused on Williams' method of practicing on a rope in preparation for her highball bouldering, culminating with her ascent of Too Big to Flail , a  highball in the Buttermilks.

Rock climbing 
In 2016, she sent Final Frontier, a 5.13b multi-pitch trad route in Yosemite, along with Father Time (5.13b) in 2018.

Notable ascents 
2015, Speed of Life V10, Farley, Massachusetts
2015, Footprints V9, Bishop, California
2015, Ray of Light V13, Rocklands, South Africa—First female ascent
2016, Final Frontier 5.13b, Yosemite, California
2016, Evilution Direct V11, Bishop, California—First female ascent
2017, Ambrosia V11, Bishop, California—First female ascent, first woman to complete the Grandpa Peabody trifecta
2018, Father Time 5.13b, Yosemite, California
2018, Window Shopper V12, Boulder, Colorado—First female ascent
2019, Too Big To Flail V10, Bishop, California—Seventh ascent, first female ascent

References

External links
 

1990 births
American rock climbers
Living people
People from Pawtucket, Rhode Island
Sportspeople from Boulder, Colorado
American female climbers
American sportswomen
21st-century American women